Bradley Singleton (born 29 October 1992) is an Ireland international rugby league footballer who plays as a  and  for the Wigan Warriors in the Betfred Super League.

He has previously played for the Leeds Rhinos in the Super League and spent time on loan from Leeds at the Dewsbury Rams, Hunslet Hawks and Featherstone Rovers in the Championship, and the Wakefield Trinity Wildcats in the Super League. Singleton has also played for the Toronto Wolfpack in the top tier.

Background
Singleton was born in Barrow-in-Furness, Cumbria, England.

Singleton is a Barrow Island product and a former pupil of Alfred Barrow School.

Club career
Singleton made his début in 2011's Super League XVI, coming off the bench in a 46-12 win over Salford. He spent time on loan at Dewsbury Rams in 2012 and Wakefield Trinity in 2013, before being sent to Hunslet on dual registration.

In 2011, Singleton broke into Leeds' first team and in 2015 was awarded the number 16 shirt and was part of Leeds' treble winning team.

He played in the 2015 Challenge Cup Final victory over Hull Kingston Rovers at Wembley Stadium.

He played in the 2015 Super League Grand Final victory over the Wigan Warriors at Old Trafford.

He played in the 2017 Super League Grand Final victory over the Castleford Tigers at Old Trafford.

Singleton played in the 2020 Super League Grand Final which Wigan lost 8-4 against St Helens.

In round 17 of the 2021 Super League season, Singleton was sent off for fighting in Wigan's 50-6 victory over Leigh.
In round 18 of the 2022 Super League season, Singleton was sent off in Wigan's 20-18 loss against St Helens at Magic Weekend for a dangerous high tackle.

International career
Singleton has honours at Under 15s and 16s level; representing England. He also captained England Academy against the French Schoolboys in a three test series.

Singleton was named in Ireland's 2017 World Cup squad.

England Knights 2013 vs Samoa.

Honours

Club
 Super League (2): 2015, 2017
 League Leaders' Shield (2): 2015,2020
 Challenge Cup (2): 2015,2022

References

External links

Leeds Rhinos profile
SL profile
2017 RLWC profile

1992 births
Living people
Cumbria rugby league team players
Dewsbury Rams players
English people of Irish descent
English rugby league players
Featherstone Rovers players
Hunslet R.L.F.C. players
Ireland national rugby league team players
Leeds Rhinos players
Rugby league props
Rugby league players from Barrow-in-Furness
Toronto Wolfpack players
Wakefield Trinity players
Wigan Warriors players